Sızıntı was a monthly Islamic magazine published between 1979 and July 2016 in Turkey. Its English-language version is known as The Fountain. The magazine was started by and is operated by members of the Gülen movement, made up of the followers of the Turkish preacher and Islamic opinion leader Fethullah Gülen, and claims to bring together Islam and science by stressing the alleged "parallels" between modern scientific discoveries and literal verses from the Quran.

Sızıntı was closed down by the Turkish authorities on 27 July 2016.

References

External links
 Official website

Islamic magazines
Cultural magazines published in Turkey
Turkish-language magazines
Monthly magazines published in Turkey
Defunct magazines published in Turkey
Magazines established in 1979
1979 establishments in Turkey
Magazines disestablished in 2016
Mass media shut down in the 2016 Turkish purges
Companies formerly affiliated with the Gülen movement
Banned magazines